Vita Green Health Products Co., Ltd., also as known as Vita Green, is a manufacturer and distributor of health and beauty products in Hong Kong. The company was set up in 1993 with two GMP certified factories. Vita Green has developed from its Hong Kong base and now has offices in Asia, Europe and United States.
It is primarily known for its line of Doctor's Choice brand vitamins, available in Mannings and Watsons locations throughout the region, as well as its traditional Chinese medicine line, which includes products such as Lingzhi and Bird's Nest.  Vita Green frequently supplies traditional Chinese herbs to universities and laboratories for scientific studies.

In 2008, Vita Green Lingzhi received the Hong Kong Top Brand Award.

Development 
Vita 1  Green Health Products Co., Ltd. invested a GMP certified plant in 1992 in Guangxi. Since its establishment in 1993, the company owns more than 15 proprietary brands and sells over 150 products. Vita Green has kept expanding its business since 2000 and has chain stores in Causeway Bay, Tsim Sha Tsui and Sha Tin etc.

Social Responsibility 
Vita Green Charitable Foundation has established on 28 June 2009. It donates financial aid to needed associations and individuals. The Foundation is operated and funded by the Vita Green Group.  All applications will initially be evaluated by a Selection Committee (‘the Committee’) consisting of a team of 5 professionals.

Spokesperson

References

Companies established in 1993
Traditional Chinese medicine
Hong Kong brands